Tetrarch is an American nu metal band from Atlanta, Georgia, United States. They are now located in Los Angeles. They have released three EPs and two albums. Their latest entitled Unstable, was released in April 2021.

History

Formation, Pravda EP,  The Will to Fight EP (2007–2012)
Tetrarch was formed in Atlanta in 2007 by Diamond Rowe and Josh Fore. According to lead guitarist Diamond Rowe, "Tetrarch began their live shows in the local scene, playing their first show at the 7 Venue in Douglasville, Georgia. They spent the rest of 2007 perfecting their live performance by playing close to 100 shows, which started a buzz in the Atlanta area. They released their first EP, Pravda in the summer of 2008, which was recorded at Ledbelly Studios by Matthew Washburn. To support their first release, Tetrarch continued to play in Atlanta while expanding their reach regionally with mini tours in the south east. In 2009, Tetrarch started working with producer Russ-T Cobb at Bang Studios in Atlanta. The band released the "Disciples of Sorrow" single from those sessions. The single caught the attention of Atlanta's biggest Rock Station, "Project 9-6-1" (96.1FM), where the band was featured for multiple weeks on the air. Tetrarch hit the studio again in late 2010 with producer Matthew Laplant at Bieler Bros studio in Pompano Beach, FL".  On May 5, 2011, while the EP was being finished, they were asked to play the main stage, supporting Avenged Sevenfold, Seether, and Alter Bridge at Verizon Wireless Amphitheater in Atlanta. With this performance, the band saw their fan base continue to grow. As a result, the band released their biggest EP to date, The Will to Fight, in the summer of 2011. "We Are The Hunters", the first single released from the EP, quickly gained attention from the metal blogs and consumers. In the summer of 2011, Tetrarch got their first taste at extensive touring by doing a 40-day east coast tour in support of the EP. The band finished the year off with a few hometown shows in Atlanta and made preparations for the busy year that was ahead of them. According to OurStage.com, Tetrarch reached two "Top 100 and three Top 40 finishes" with this EP. In the summer of 2012, Tetrarch was in Audiohammer Studios in Sanford, FL with Jason Suecof and Eyal Levi working on a their Relentless EP, a follow up to 2011's The Will to Fight.

Relentless EP (2013)
Tetrarch's new EP entitled Relentless was released on March 19, 2013. Relentless was produced by Eyal Levi and Jason Suecof at Audiohammer Studios in Sanford, Florida. The EP's artwork was done by McBridge Design. According to lead guitarist Diamond Rowe, "Relentless is very different from [the] last EP, The Will to Fight, but at the same time you can still tell that it is the same band." The first single was the title track, released on February 24, 2013.  On March 3, 2013 the band released "Take Your Best Shot" as their second single; and on March 15, 2013 "Final Words" was released as their third single. A music video for "Final Words" was released exclusively through Revolver Magazine on March 15, 2013. This music video was directed by Jeffrey Moore. Lead guitarist Diamond Rowe was featured in the book "WHAT ARE YOU DOING HERE? A Black Woman’s Life and Liberation in Heavy Metal", by Laina Dawes. The book "investigates how black women musicians and fans navigate the metal, hardcore, and punk music genres that are regularly thought of as inclusive spaces and centered on a community spirit, but fail to block out the race and gender issues that exist in the outside world." The band headlined their first shows of 2013 on May 24 at The Masquerade in Atlanta, GA and May 25 at Firewater 110 in Rock Hill, SC. On July 5, 2013 the band announced their first complete tour, headlining the "Here We Stand Tour" (August–September 2013) sponsored by Outerloop Management. The band closed the year out with 3 shows from December 13–15, 2013 spanning from Albany, Georgia at The Oglethorpe Lounge to Port Charlotte, Florida at Voodoo.

New Album (2013–2017)
The band entered Audiohammer Studios in Sanford, Florida with Eyal Levi to record their newest album on December 16, 2013; which followed a 3-day headliner (December 13–15, 2013) spanning from Albany, Georgia to Port Charlotte, Florida. The Port Charlotte date was moved to The Goathouse in Odessa, Florida with Illuminate Me. To open 2014, Tetrarch are scheduled to provide support to Straight Line Stitch, Goodbye October, and Viscera on January 17, 2014 at The Lantern (relocated from DJ's Tavern) in Rome, Georgia; and are also scheduled to headline the "Hometown Throwdown" on January 18, 2014 at The Masquerade in Atlanta with support from Prime Mover, As Animals Eat My Insides, and Living With Strangers. The band's first confirmed tour of 2014 was an east coast headliner, "The Please Don't Snow" Tour (January 23–30, 2014) that reached from South Carolina to Pennsylvania. On February 6, 2014, the band announced their headliner "The Take Your West Shot Tour" (February 21 - March 1, 2014) that reaches from Albany, Georgia to Terrell, Texas. Tetrarch has tentative/unannounced tours scheduled in the United States and Canada for the remainder of 2014.

Freak, Unstable (2017–current)
In 2017, the band released Freak. On May 15, 2017, the band released a music video for the song "I'm Not Right". On February 4, 2021, the band announced that their latest album Unstable would be released on April 30, 2021. The song "You Never Listen" was elected by Loudwire as the 23rd best metal song of 2021.

Band members
Current members
Josh Fore - lead vocals, rhythm guitar (2007–present); drums (2012–2015)
Diamond Rowe - lead guitar, backing vocals (2007–present)
Ryan Lerner - bass (2009–present)
Ruben Limas - drums, percussion (2015–present)

Former members
Tyler Wesley - drums, percussion (2007–2010)
Nick Jones - drums, percussion (2010–2011)
Jared Vann - drums, percussion (2011–2012)
Michael Bowles - bass (2008–2009)
Thomas Taylor - bass (2007–2008)

Timeline

Discography

Albums
 Freak (Self-released, 2017)
 Unstable (Napalm, 2021)

EPs
 Relentless EP (Self-released, 2013)
 Addicted EP (2021)

Singles

Music videos

References

External links
MySpace

Heavy metal musical groups from Georgia (U.S. state)
American nu metal musical groups
Musical groups established in 2007